The following shows the public housing estates, including Home Ownership Scheme (HOS), Private Sector Participation Scheme (PSPS), Tenant Purchase Scheme (TPS) in Lam Tin of Kwun Tong District, Kowloon, Hong Kong.

History 

Lam Tin is the hill area at the southeast of Kwun Tong District. There was a resettlement estate in the area, called Lam Tin Resettlement Estate in the 1960s.

The resettlement has totally 23 blocks. Block 15 was also the 500th public estate building constructed by the Works Bureau. All the blocks in the estate were demolished in Lam Tin Estate Redevelopment Project between the 1980s and 2000s. They were replaced by new blocks of Kai Tin Estate, Ping Tin Estate, On Tin Estate and new Lam Tin Estate.

Overview

Hing Tin Estate 

Hing Tin Estate is a mixed public and TPS estate at the north of Lam Tin, near the Kwun Tong side exit of Tseung Kwan O Tunnel. It consists of 3 blocks completed in 1987. Some of the flats were sold to tenants during Tenants Purchase Scheme Phase 4 in 2001.

Houses

Hong Nga Court 

Hong Nga Court is a HOS court in Lam Tin, near Tak Tin Estate. It has 3 blocks built in 1993.

Houses

Hong Pak Court 

Hong Pak Court is a HOS court in Lam Tin, near Kwong Tin Estate. It has 7 blocks built in 1993.

Houses

Hong Shui Court 
Hong Shui Court is a HOS court in Lam Tin, near Kwong Tin Estate. It has 1 block built in 1999.

House

Hong Tin Court 

Hong Tin Court is a HOS court in Lam Tin, near Kai Tin Estate and MTR Lam Tin station. It has 3 blocks built in 1982, and it is the oldest HOS court in Lam Tin.

Houses

Hong Wah Court 

Hong Wah Court is a HOS court in Lam Tin, near Hing Tin Estate. It has 3 blocks built in 1987.

Houses

Hong Yat Court 

Hong Yat Court is a HOS court in Lam Tin, near Kai Tin Estate, Lam Tin Estate and MTR Lam Tin station. It belonged to Phase 5 of the Lam Tin Redevelopment Project. It has 5 blocks built in 2001.

Houses

Hong Ying Court 

Hong Ying Court is a HOS court in Lam Tin, near Tak Tin Estate. It has 1 block built in 1991.

House

Kai Tin Estate 

Kai Tin Estate formed part of the Lam Tin Estate redevelopment project. It consists of 3 blocks and a shopping centre built in 1997.

Houses

Kwong Tin Estate 

Kwong Tin Estate is located between Lam Tin and Yau Tong. It has four blocks built in 1992 and 1993.

Houses

Lei On Court 

Lei On Court is a HOS estate in Lei Yue Mun Road, Lam Tin, Kwun Tong, Kowloon, Hong Kong, located near MTR Lam Tin station. Built in 2002, it consists of six Concord-typed blocks, providing a total of 1684 flats. Blocks A, D, E and F are built in conjunction with the carpark building, whereas Block B and C stand separately at the northwest of the Court.

Background 
Lei On Court was built at the former site of a public housing estate, Kwun Tong (Lei Yue Mun Road) Estate (which is different from the current Lei Yue Mun Estate). Kwun Tong (Lei Yue Mun Road) Estate was built in 1962 and demolished in 1997. It was replaced by the current Lei On Court, an HOS estate.

Houses

On Tin Estate 

On Tin Estate was a part of Lam Tin Estate Redevelopment Project. Built above Kai Tin Shopping Centre Extension, the estate has two block completed in 2005.

Houses

Ping Tin Estate 

Ping Tin Estate was a part of Lam Tin Estate Redevelopment Project. It consists of 8 blocks (including one Ancillary Facilities Block for Housing for Senior Citizen) completed in 1997 and 1998.

Houses

Tak Tin Estate 

Tak Tin Estate is a mixed public/TPS estate in Lam Tin, near Ping Tin Estate and Lam Tin Estate. It consists of 9 blocks completed in 1991 and 2001. In 1999, some of the flats (Tak Hong House and Tak Yan House excluded) were sold to tenants through Tenants Purchase Scheme Phase 2.

Houses

Lam Tin Estate 

The current Lam Tin Estate is smaller than the original one, and it has 4 blocks completed in 2009. Its predecessor was a resettlement estate from the 1960s to 1990s. Andy Lau, a Hong Kong famous singer, lived in Block 15 of the estate when he was a child. It was demolished between the 1990s and 2000s and its area is redeveloped to construct Kai Tin Estate, Ping Tin Estate, On Tin Estate, Hong Yat Court and the new Lam Tin Estate. Andy Lau also autographed 'Lam Tin Estate' in Chinese calligraphy at the time of the estate completion.

Houses

References 

Lam Tin
Kwun Tong District
 
 
 

zh:藍田邨